Ptychitoidea, formerly Ptychitacheae, is a superfamily of typically involute, subglobular to discoidal Ceratitida in which the shell is smooth with lateral folds or striations, inner whorls are globose, and the suture is commonly ammonitic. Their range is Middle_ and Upper Triassic.

In its present configuration the Ptychitoidea includes  three families, the:
Ptychitidae 
Eosagenitidae
Sturiidae

This differs from the taxonomy in the Treatise on Invertebrate Paleontology, Part L, in which the Ptychitoidea included the
Ptychitidae
Isculitidae
Nannititdae

The Isculitidae have since been removed to the Pinacocerataceae and the Nannitidae to the Danubitaceae.

Fossils of Ptychitoidea have been found in the Triassic of California and Nevada in the United States; British Columbia and Nunavut in Canada; Italy, Switzerland,  and Hungary in Europe; Russia, China, and Afghanistan in Eurasia; Tunisia, Oman, Malaysia, and Papua New Guinea.

References 

 Treatise on Invertebrate Paleontology, Part L, Ammonoidea. R. C. Moore (ed). Geological Society of America and Univ of Kansas press, 1957 
  superfamily Ptychitaceae Mojsisovics 1882    Paleobiology DB

 
Ceratitida superfamilies
Middle Triassic first appearances
Late Triassic extinctions